Chamberaud is a commune in the Creuse department in the Nouvelle-Aquitaine region in central France.

Geography

Population

Sights
 The church of St. Blaise, dating from the thirteenth century.

See also
Communes of the Creuse department

References

External links
Personal website about Chamberaud 

Communes of Creuse